The National Football Conference – Eastern Division or NFC East  is one of the four divisions of the National Football Conference (NFC) in the National Football League (NFL). It currently has four members: the Dallas Cowboys (based in Arlington, Texas), New York Giants (based in East Rutherford, New Jersey), Philadelphia Eagles (based in Philadelphia, Pennsylvania), and the Washington Commanders (based in Landover, Maryland).

The division was formed in 1967 as the National Football League Capitol Division and acquired its current name in 1970 when the NFL merged with the American Football League. The NFC East is currently the only division in the league in which all four current teams have won at least one Super Bowl. With 13 Super Bowl titles, the NFC East is currently the most successful division in the NFL during the Super Bowl era, with the AFC East second with nine titles.

History
The division's original name derived from it being centered on the capital of the United States, Washington, D.C., and the country's birthplace, Philadelphia. In 1967 and 1969 the teams in the NFL Capitol Division were Dallas, Philadelphia, Washington and the expansion team New Orleans Saints, with the New York Giants swapping divisions with the Saints for the 1968 season. This arrangement had been agreed in advance as a means to ensure all of the NFL's teams would be able to visit New York once in those three years. With the merger in 1970, following contentious negotiations culminating in a random draw, it was agreed that New York (along with the St. Louis Cardinals) would permanently return to the re-branded NFC East.

The NFC East has a long history of being geographically inaccurate.  While the New York Giants, Philadelphia, and Washington are based on the East Coast, Dallas and St. Louis (later Phoenix, then Arizona) remained a part of the East from the 1970 merger until 2002 (and after the move to Phoenix in 1987) despite being geographically west of most teams in the conference and closer to the Pacific Ocean.

To begin with, the Cowboys were only located east of two NFC teams that were outside of the East division (Los Angeles Rams and San Francisco 49ers from the West division) while the Cardinals were east of one additional such team (Minnesota Vikings from the Central division).  The Tampa Bay Buccaneers joined the Central as an expansion team in 1976; they're located east of Dallas and St. Louis. The Cardinals relocated to Phoenix to start the  season and stayed in the East through ; that made them located west of every team in the NFC except for the Rams and 49ers.  The Rams relocated from Los Angeles to St. Louis to start the  season and stayed in the West, while the Carolina Panthers joined the West as an expansion team that same season; this made the Cardinals and Cowboys west of every team in the conference except for the 49ers from 1995 to 2001.

While the divisions in general have been much more geographically accurate since 2002, even following the Rams' return to Los Angeles the Cowboys are further west than every team in the league except for seven of the eight West teams in both conferences, in addition to the Kansas City Chiefs of the AFC West.

General information

The NFC East teams have combined to be the most successful division in the Super Bowl era with 21 NFC championships and 13 Super Bowl victories, the highest marks of any division in the NFL. The division features a number of prominent rivalries such as the Cowboys–Eagles rivalry, Cowboys–Washington rivalry and Eagles–Giants rivalry, among others. Because the division's teams are in some of the United States' largest media markets (New York No. 1, Philadelphia No. 4, Dallas-Fort Worth No. 5, and Washington No. 9), the NFC East receives a high amount of coverage from national sports media outlets. In the early 1990s the division claimed four consecutive Super Bowl champions, all against the Buffalo Bills, with the Giants and Washington respectively winning back-to-back in Super Bowls XXV and XXVI; and the Cowboys winning twice after in Super Bowls XXVII and XXVIII. Those same three teams won seven out of ten Super Bowls, from 1986–87 to 1995–96 (the 49ers won the other three during that span). The Eagles are the most recent team in the division to win a Super Bowl, beating the Patriots 41–33 in Super Bowl LII.

The NFC East was the first division since the 2002 realignment to send 3 teams to the playoffs when the 2006-07 NFL playoffs had Philadelphia winning the division and Dallas and New York taking both Wild Card spots. On the other hand, the NFC East became one of three divisions to be won by a team with a losing record (the previous two being the NFC South and NFC West) when the then-Washington Football Team won the  division crown with a 7-9 record.

The Philadelphia Eagles are the only NFC East team to actually play in the city of the team's naming, Philadelphia. The other three teams play in suburbs of the major cities they are named after. The Dallas Cowboys play in Arlington, Texas, and is the only team in this division that is not based in the Eastern Time Zone (the Cowboys are based in the Central Time Zone). The Washington Commanders play in Landover, Maryland and the New York Giants play in East Rutherford, New Jersey, where they share a stadium with the New York Jets. Analogously, three of the four AFC East teams do not actually play within the city of their naming. (The Patriots geographical identifier is New England, being named for the region the team plays in.)

The NFC East can also be called the most valuable NFL division. All four teams in the division are in the top ten of most valuable NFL franchises (Cowboys #1; Giants #4;  Commanders #6; Eagles #10). The next closest division is the AFC East, which is not completed until the 29th ranked Buffalo Bills.

Division lineups

Place cursor over year for division champion.
 

 The Eastern Conference was divided into the Capitol and Century Divisions. Dallas, Philadelphia, and Washington moved in. Also, the New Orleans Saints joined the league.
The Capitol Division adopts its current name. New Orleans realigned to the NFC West. The Giants and Cardinals are added from the Century Division.
Although the Cardinals were division champions, the Cowboys won the NFC Championship as a wild card qualifier.
St. Louis moved to Phoenix in 1988. The team changed its name from Phoenix Cardinals to the Arizona Cardinals in 1994. 
Arizona moved to the NFC West when the league realigned into eight four-team divisions before the 2002 season.
Although the Cowboys were division champions, the Giants won the Super Bowl as a wild card qualifier.

Division champions

As NFL Capitol Division

There was one division sweep of the Capitol Division: the 1969 Cowboys went 6–0 in division matchups.

As NFC East
There has not been a repeat division champion since 2004. This is the longest active streak among divisions in the NFL as well as the longest in league history.

 * A players' strike in 1982 reduced the regular season to nine games. Thus, the league used a special 16-team playoff tournament just for this year. Division standings were ignored; Washington had the best record of the division teams and won the Super Bowl.
 ++ The 1987 Redskins are the only NFC 3rd Seed to win the Super Bowl.
 ^ The 2007 Dallas Cowboys were defeated by division rival and NFC 5th Seed New York Giants, who ultimately won Super Bowl XLII.
 # The 2011 New York Giants are the only sub-10-win team to win the Super Bowl (other than the 1982 Redskins listed above), as well as the first team to win the Super Bowl as the NFC's 4th Seed.

All four teams in the NFC East have won the Super Bowl. The Cowboys lead with five, followed by the Giants with four, Washington with three, and the Eagles with one. In overall NFL history, however, the Giants lead with eight league championships, followed by the Cowboys and Washington with five each, then the Eagles with four.

There have been three division sweeps of the NFC East Division, the 1998 Dallas Cowboys (8–0), the 2004 Philadelphia Eagles (6–0), and the 2021 Dallas Cowboys (6–0).

Wild Card qualifiers

 +  A players' strike in 1982 reduced the regular season to nine games, so the league used a special 16-team playoff tournament just for this year.
 ** The 2007 New York Giants are the only NFC East team to win a Super Bowl as a Wild Card team, and the first NFL team in history to win the Super Bowl as a 5th Seed in either Conference.

Total playoff berths since 1967

To sort table above, click button to right of heading.

1These numbers only reflect the Cardinals' time as a member of the NFC East, as the team realigned to the NFC West after the 2001 season.

Season results

See also
Cowboys–Giants rivalry
Cowboys–Eagles rivalry
Commanders–Cowboys rivalry
Eagles–Giants rivalry
Commanders–Eagles rivalry
Commanders–Giants rivalry

References

National Football League divisions
Sports in the Eastern United States
Arizona Cardinals
St. Louis Cardinals (football)
Dallas Cowboys
New York Giants
Philadelphia Eagles
Washington Commanders
New Orleans Saints
1967 establishments in the United States